Paul Beauchamp (1924–2001) was a French Jesuit and theologian.

1924 births
2001 deaths
French biblical scholars
20th-century French Jesuits
20th-century French Catholic theologians